Linda Hesse (born 22 May 1987) is a German singer.

Life 
Linda Hesse grew up in Halberstadt. She attended a high school and took singing lessons. In 2004 she was a participant in the Sat.1 casting show Star Search. After graduation in 2007, she became a member of the pop music group Wir3.

In 2011, Hesse began her solo career. On 26 October 2012 she released her debut single I'm not a man. On 15 February 2013 her debut album Punktgenau Landung was released.

Hesse was photographed as a cover girl for the June 2018 issue of the German Playboy.

Philanthropy 
She has supported children and adolescents suffering from cancer. In 2014, Hesse became ambassador of the German Cancer Aid campaign. On the occasion of the 40th anniversary of the organization, she dedicated her song With all her might. In 2016 she gave an exclusive concert for children with cancer at the Charité Berlin with bandmate and life partner André Franke. In 2017, she continued her music career with an exclusive concert at the Department of Paediatrics and Adolescent Medicine at the Carl Gustav Carus Dresden University Hospital.

Discography

Album 

 2013: Punktgenaue Landung
 2014: Hör auf dein Herz
 2016: Sonnenkind
 2018: Mach ma laut

Singles 

 2012: Ich bin ja kein Mann
 2012: Santa Claus kommt einmal im Jahr (Santa Claus Is Coming to Town)
 2013: Komm bitte nicht
 2013: Punktgenaue Landung
 2014: Knutschen… ich kann nichts dafür
 2014: Verbotene Liebe
 2015: Hör auf Dein Herz
 2015: Mit aller Kraft (Mein Song für die Deutsche Krebshilfe)
 2016: Noch immer so wie immer
 2016: Nein
 2017: Bunt
 2018: Mach ma laut

References

External links 
 
 
 Official Website of Linda Hesse

1987 births
Living people
People from Halberstadt
People from Bezirk Magdeburg
German women pop singers
21st-century German women singers